Scartella is a genus of combtooth blennies found in the Atlantic and Indian oceans.

Species
There are currently seven recognized species in this genus:
 Scartella caboverdiana Bath, 1990
 Scartella cristata (Linnaeus, 1758) – Molly miller
 Scartella emarginata (Günther, 1861) – Maned blenny
 Scartella itajobi Rangel & L. F. Mendes, 2009
 Scartella nuchifilis (Valenciennes, 1836)
 Scartella poiti Rangel, Gasparini & R. Z. P. Guimarães, 2004
 Scartella springeri (Bauchot, 1967) – Springer's blenny

References

 
Taxa named by David Starr Jordan
Salarinae